Good Sport is a 1931 American comedy film directed by Kenneth MacKenna and written by William Hurlbut. The film stars Linda Watkins, John Boles, Greta Nissen, Minna Gombell, Hedda Hopper and Alan Dinehart. The film was released on December 13, 1931, by Fox Film Corporation.

Plot
When her husband (Alan Dinehart) sails for a 3 month business trip in Europe, an unsophisticated wife (Linda Watkins) sublets a Manhattan apartment so she can occupy herself with shopping and the theater. While in the apartment, she discovers that it belongs to her husband's mistress (Greta Nissen), who has accompanied him to Europe. The plot then focuses on the adventures of Linda Watkins character, and as she try's to find love.

Cast     
   
Linda Watkins as Marilyn Parker
John Boles as Boyce Cameron
Greta Nissen as Peggy Bums
Minna Gombell as Virginia Casey
Hedda Hopper as Mrs. Atherton
Alan Dinehart as Rex Parker
Claire Maynard as Queenie
Louise Beavers as September
Sally Blane as Marge
Betty Francisco as Laura
Ethel Kenyon as Loretta
Inez Norton as Nita
Joan Carr as Violet
Joyce Compton as Fay
John T. Murray as Harry Kendricks
Christine Maple as Party Girl
Nadine Dore as Party Girl
Geneva Mitchell as Party Girl
Eleanor Hunt as Party Girl

References

External links 
 

1931 films
Fox Film films
American comedy films
1931 comedy films
American black-and-white films
1930s English-language films
1930s American films